Inês Maria Brito Braga (born 28 June 1984) is a  Portuguese female water polo player, playing at the driver position. She is part of the Portugal women's national water polo team. She competed at the 2016 Women's European Water Polo Championship.

See also
 :es:Inês Braga

References

Further reading
 Greece control Spain, meet Serbia in semis
 EPA.eu Water Polo Photos
 

1984 births
Living people
Portuguese female water polo players
Competitors at the 2018 Mediterranean Games
Place of birth missing (living people)
Mediterranean Games competitors for Portugal